Edward Herrick Gibson (July 4, 1872 – April 25, 1942) was a United States Army Sergeant received the Medal of Honor for actions during the Philippine–American War. He was awarded the Medal for the same action as Corporal Antoine Gaujot.  The Medal was received for actions on December 19, 1899, at the Battle of Paye near Mateo during the Philippine–American War. Gibson is buried in Golden Gate National Cemetery in San Bruno, California.

Gibson enlisted in the Army in July 1899, and was discharged in April 1901.

Medal of Honor citation
Rank and organization: Sergeant, Company M, 27th Infantry, U.S. Volunteers. Place and date: At San Mateo, Philippine Islands, December 19, 1899. Entered service at: Boston, Mass. Birth: Boston, Mass. Date of issue: Unknown.

Citation:

Attempted under a heavy fire of the enemy to swim a river for the purpose of obtaining and returning with a canoe.

See also
 List of Medal of Honor recipients
 List of Philippine–American War Medal of Honor recipients

Notes

References
 
 

United States Army soldiers
People from Boston
United States Army Medal of Honor recipients
1872 births
1942 deaths
American military personnel of the Philippine–American War
Philippine–American War recipients of the Medal of Honor
Burials at Golden Gate National Cemetery